AssuredPartners NL (formerly Assured Neace Lukens) is an insurance brokerage firm founded in 2011 by John Neace and Joe Lukens. With headquarters in Louisville, Kentucky, the company has more than 500 licensed agents and more than 850 employees operating in 38 states and 2 countries.

History 
The company Assured Neace Lukens was founded in 1991 by John Neace and Joe Lukens.

In September 2011, Neace Lukens was acquired by AssuredPartners, Inc.; AssuredPartners, Inc., in turn, is owned by Apax Partners.

Management 
Currently, Randy Larsen is a President of AssuredPartners NL. 

Former presidents
 Todd Stocksdale
Larry Schaefer

Jim Henderson is the company's Chairman and CEO.

A leadership team consists of 9 people.

Acquisitions 
AssuredPartners Inc. made 204 acquisitions at all.

During 2021, the company acquired 14 enterprises. 

In 2018, AssuredPartners Inc. has acquired Cornerstone Insurance Group.

In 2012, the company owned Morehead Insurance, Arison Insurance Services, Inc. etc.

Ranking 
As of July 2011, Neace Lukens was the 24th largest private insurance firm in the country as ranked by Business Insurance magazine.

In July 2020, AssuredPartners NL was listed as the 11th largest broker of U.S. business by Business Insurance, featuring the “100 Largest Brokers of U.S. Business”.

Also the company was recognised as one of the Best Companies to Work for in Lake Mary, FL by Zippia's ranking.

Awards 
2019 — Best Employer in Ohio by the Ohio SHRM State Council and Best Companies Group.

2016 — Best Place to Work in Kentucky by the Kentucky Society for Human Resource Management and the Kentucky Chamber of Commerce.

References

External links
 
Randy J. Larsen LinkedIn 

Insurance companies of the United States
Companies based in Louisville, Kentucky
1991 establishments in Kentucky
American companies established in 1991
Financial services companies established in 1991
Financial services companies of the United States
1991 establishments in the United States